Bruckmann is a German surname. Notable people with the surname include:

Alexander Bruckmann (1806–1852), German painter
Elsa Bruckmann (1865–1946), wife of Hugo Bruckmann
Erich Bruckmann (1930–2011), Canadian boat builder
Franz Ernst Brückmann (1697–1753), German doctor and mineralogist
Gergő Bruckmann (born 1995), Hungarian modern pentathlete
Hugo Bruckmann (1863–1941), German publisher

See also 
Bruckmann, Rosser, Sherrill & Co., private equity firm
Bruckman
Brugmann

German-language surnames